The 2014 Southland Conference tournament was held at North Oak Park on the campus of Southeastern Louisiana University in Hammond, Louisiana, from May 8 through 11, 2014. The tournament winner, Northwestern State earned the Southland Conference's automatic bid to the 2014 NCAA Division I softball tournament. Due to weather delays, the championship broadcast on ESPN3 was canceled, leaving the entire tournament to air on the Southland Digital Network. Southland Conference assistant commissioner Chris Mycoskie and former Southeastern Louisiana pitcher Kati Morse called the action.

Format
The top 6 teams qualified for the Southland softball tournament. Abilene Christian and Incarnate Word were currently ineligible due to their transition from D2 to D1. Had either of the two teams been in the top 6 spots, the seventh and if necessary eighth teams would have qualified for the tournament and would have taken their respective spots.

Tournament

All times listed are Central Daylight Time.

Line Scores

Day One

Game 1 (Houston Baptist vs Stephen F. Austin)

Game 2 (Central Arkansas vs Sam Houston State)

Game 3 (Houston Baptist vs McNeese State)

Game 4 (Central Arkansas vs Northwestern State)

Day Two

Game 5 (Sam Houston State vs Houston Baptist)

Game 6 (Stephen F. Austin vs Central Arkansas)

Game 7 (McNeese State vs Northwestern State)

Semi-final Game One (Stephen F. Austin vs Sam Houston State)

Semi-final Game Two (McNeese State vs Stephen F. Austin)

Day Three

Championship Game (Northwestern State vs McNeese State)

Awards and honors
Source:  

Tournament MVP: Kaylee Guidry – Northwestern State
All-Tournament Teams:

 Tiffany Castillo – Sam Houston State
 Shalie Day – Stephen F. Austin
 Carlie Thomas – Stephen F. Austin
 Alanna DiVittorio – McNeese State
 Marissa Taunton – McNeese State
 Ashley Modzelewski – McNeese State
 Lauren Wagner – McNeese State
 Jamie Allred – McNeese State
 Shenequia Abby – Northwestern State
 Cali Burke – Northwestern State
 Tara McKenney – Northwestern State
 Kaylee Guidry – Northwestern State

See also
 2014 Southland Conference baseball tournament

References

Southland Conference softball tournament
Tournament